Dai Jiaoqian (born 4 June 1982), also known as Shirley Dai, is a Chinese actress, singer and hostess.

Dai is noted for her roles as Liu Xia and Princess Xingdai in the television series Flowering Season, Rainy Season (1998) and The Palace: the Lost Daughter (2014) respectively.

Life

Early life
Dai was born in Shanghai on June 4, 1982, where she attended the Shanghai No.3 Middle School for Girls and Shanghai Caoyang NO.2 High School, with her ancestral home in Nanjing, Jiangsu. Dai graduated as a recommended student, majoring in Chinese language.

Acting career
Dai first rose to prominence in 1998 for playing Liu Xia in the television series Flowering Season, Rainy Season, for which she received nominations at the 17th Golden Eagle Awards.

Dai's first film role was a clerk uncredited appearance in the film Crash Landing (2000).

In 2002, Dai had a supporting role in Contact, which won Best Supporting Actress at the 12th Chunyan Awards.

In 2004, Dai played her role as Ru Yu in the Xiaozhuang Epic sequel, Secret History of the Crown Prince.

In 2005, Dai participated in Jeffrey Lau's A Chinese Tall Story, a fantasy adventure film starring Nicholas Tse, Charlene Choi, Fan Bingbing, Bolin Chen and Steven Cheung.

She starred in many television series, such as Phoenix Swing (2001), Shouting for You to Come Back (2007), Spring Goes, Spring Comes (2008) and The Diamond Family (2009).

In 2007, Dai appeared as Jian Xiong in The Sword and the Chess of Death, a wuxia television series starring Tony Sun, Jenson Tien, Liu Tao and Ray Lui.

In 2010, Dai starred as Tong Jinyu, reuniting her with co-star Kingdom Yuen, who played Ma Linglong, in the television series Happy Mother-in-Law, Pretty Daughter-in-Law.

In 2011, Dai played the character Li Qinghe in The Legend of Crazy Monk 2, an ancient costume comedy starring Benny Chan, Lam Chi-chung, Zhang Liang and Ye Zuxin.

Dai played a supporting role Huo Caidie in the 2012 wuxia television series The Bride with White Hair, adapted from Liang Yusheng's novel of the same title. The same year, Dai starred in the romantic comedy television series Mermaid Legend, alongside Kenny Kwan, Zanilia Zhao and Ding Zijun, the series was one of the most watched ones in mainland China in that year. In 2013, China Whisper described her as "Top 10 Most Beautiful Girls in Shanghai".

In 2014, Dai starred with Lu Yi, Mabel Yuan, Gao Yunxiang and Yang Rong in The Palace: the Lost Daughter, the sequel to 2012's Palace II,

Filmography

Film

Television series

Single
 Over the Heart 
 I Know
 Call
 My Motherland, I Love You
 The Sound a Flower Blooms
 Shouting for You to Come Back
 A Little Happy Woman
 Love of The Starry Sky 
 Figure
 Suddenly Remind of You

Television Programme
 Travel Channel Inc. - Top Model
 CCTV-4 - Cyber Sunday
 Hebei Television - Wonderful Television
 Tianjin Television - The Legendary Swordsman
 China Education Television
 Dragon Television

Awards

References

External links

1982 births
Singers from Shanghai
East China Normal University alumni
Chinese television actresses
Chinese film actresses
Living people
Actresses from Shanghai
21st-century Chinese women  singers
Women television producers
Chinese women television presenters
Chinese television presenters
Chinese broadcasters
VJs (media personalities)